The 1906 News of the World Match Play was the fourth News of the World Match Play tournament. It was played from Tuesday 2 to Thursday 4 October at Notts Golf Club. 32 players competed in a straight knock-out competition, with each match contested over 18 holes, except for the final which was over 36 holes. The winner received £100 out of a total prize fund of £240. Sandy Herd defeated Charles Mayo 8 & 7 in the final to win the tournament.

Qualification
Entry was restricted to members of the Professional Golfers' Association (PGA). Qualification was by a series of 36-hole stroke-play competitions; one for each of the six PGA sections. The Southern section had 16 qualifiers, the Midland and Northern sections had 5 each, the Scottish section 3, the Irish section 2 and the Welsh section 1. In the event of a tie for places there was a playoff.

The qualifiers were:

Irish section: Harry Kidd, Bertie Snowball
Midland section: George Cawsey, Jack Fulford, Alfred Lewis, Jack Oke, Walter Tedder
Northern section: George Duncan, Sandy Herd, Ted Ray, Thomas Renouf, Charles Roberts
Southern section: James Braid, Arthur Catlin, Harry Chestney, Willie Hunter, Sr., Rowland Jones, Fred Leach, Charles Mayo, Wilfrid Reid, Herbert Riseborough, James Sherlock, Ralph Smith, David Stephenson, J.H. Taylor, Alfred Toogood, Harry Vardon, Tom Vardon
Scottish section: Andrew Grant, Ben Sayers, Robert Thomson
Welsh section: Jack Ross

Format
The format was unchanged. Matches were over 18 holes except for the final which was over 36 holes. Extra holes were played in the event of a tied match. Two rounds were played on the first day, two more on the second day with the final on the third day.

Results
Source:

w/o = Walkover

Prize money
The winner received £100 and a gold medal, the runner-up £30 and a silver medal, the losing semi-finalists £15 and a bronze medal, while the third round losers received £10 and the second round losers received £5.

References

Golf tournaments in England
News of the World Match Play
News of the World Match Play
October 1906 sports events